Portfolio is the debut studio album by Grace Jones, released in 1977 by Island Records. It spawned her first big hit, "La Vie en rose".

Background and production
Having enjoyed a successful modelling career in Paris and New York in the early 1970s, Jones released a series of singles throughout 1975–1976. None of them, however, managed to succeed in mainstream charts. Jones secured a record deal with Island Records in 1977 and found wider recognition only with her debut Island album, Portfolio.

The album was recorded and mixed in Sigma Sound Studios in Philadelphia, and released in autumn 1977 as the first of three albums made with the legendary disco record producer Tom Moulton. Side one of the original vinyl album is a continuous disco medley covering three songs from Broadway musicals, "Send in the Clowns" by Stephen Sondheim from A Little Night Music, "What I Did for Love" from A Chorus Line and "Tomorrow" from Annie. Side two opens with Jones' very personal re-interpretation of Édith Piaf's "La Vie en rose" and continues with three new recordings, two of which were co-written by Jones herself. The Italian release would omit "Sorry" and "That's the Trouble", adding an extended, over 7-minute-long version of "I Need a Man" instead. The album's artwork was designed by Richard Bernstein, an artist working for Interview, who would later contribute to Jones' two next albums' artworks and with whom the singer would re-team up for the 1986 album Inside Story.

Singles
"I Need a Man" was Jones' debut single, originally released in 1975 by the minor French label Orfeus. It failed to make any chart impact until two years later, when it was re-mixed and released via the Beam Junction label, becoming a number-one dance hit in the US and introducing Jones to club audiences, primarily gay. The second single, "Sorry", was released a year prior to the Portfolio album, and was a modest success on the US singles chart. Its B-side track, "That's the Trouble", also received a separate A-side release. Both songs were Jones' first forays into songwriting. "La Vie en rose" was released as a single in autumn 1977 and became the biggest hit from Portfolio, having charted in the French and Italian top 5. When re-released in 1983, it reached the top 5 in the Netherlands. "What I Did for Love" became a top 10 dance hit in the US.

Critical reception

The album received unfavorable reviews from music critics. Andrew Hamilton from AllMusic website gave the album two out of five stars and wrote that "though polished [the album] tracks don't jump out at you" and conclude that it was more a "producer's album." He also gave credit to her because "she gives credence to old fuddies" like "Send in the Clowns," "La Vie en Rose" and "I Need a Man," whose according to him "displays a vulnerable Jones". Robert Christgau gave the album a C+ and praise the way Jones sing the songs ("very liberated, very punky"). He also wrote that Jones "sings flat enough to make Andrea True sound like Linda Ronstadt and Tom Verlaine like Art Garfunkel". Rolling Stone magazine gave the album one out of five stars.

Commercial performance
Portfolio reached number 52 on the Black Albums Chart in the US, while climbing to number 109 on Billboards mainstream albums chart. It garnered more attention in Europe, entering the top 10 in both Italy in early 1978 and the Netherlands in 1983.

Track listing
All tracks produced by Tom Moulton.

Notes
 Side one's tracks are a non-stop medley, with its total playing time being 18:36.
 Italian releases of the record feature the same tracklist as the original release, but exclude "Sorry" and "That's the Trouble".

Personnel

 Wilbur Bascomb – bass guitar
 Richard Bernstein – album graphics concept, design and painting
 Bobby Eli – guitars
 Grace Jones – vocals
 Francis Jug – photography
 Carlton "Cotton" Kent – keyboards, piano
 Ron "Have Mercy" Kersey – Rhodes piano
 Antonio Lopez – photography
 Jay Mark – recording and mixing engineering
 Vincent Montana Jr. – arrangement, conducting, vibraphone
 Cliff Morris – guitars

 Moto – tambourines
 Lance Quinn – guitars
 Don Renaldo – strings, horns
 José Rodriguez – mastering
 Allan Schwartzberg – drums
 Arthur Stoppe – recording and mixing engineering
 Sweethearts of Sigma (Barbara Ingram, Carla Benson, Evette Benton) – backing vocals
 Larry Washington – conga
 Duke Williams – arrangement

Charts

Release history

References

External links
 Portfolio on Discogs
 Portfolio on Rate Your Music

1977 debut albums
Grace Jones albums
Albums produced by Tom Moulton
Albums recorded at Sigma Sound Studios
Island Records albums